Euphorbia millotii is a species of plant in the family Euphorbiaceae. It is endemic to Madagascar.  Its natural habitat is subtropical or tropical moist shrubland. It is threatened by habitat loss.

References

Endemic flora of Madagascar
millotii
Critically endangered plants
Taxonomy articles created by Polbot